Laura Umansky is an American entrepreneur and interior designer. She is the founder and president of Laura U Design Collective, a luxury residential interior design studio based in Houston, Texas and Aspen, Colorado. Known for her signature Classically Current style, Umansky has been recognized on the National Gold List by Luxe Magazine. Her company has received multiple awards from the American Society of Interior Designers. Umansky was featured on the cover of HGTV Magazine.

Early life and education
Laura Umansky was born and raised in Texas. She completed her undergraduate studies at The University of Texas, earning a degree in studio art. Later, Umansky earned her Master's degree in architecture at the University of Houston.

Career
Umansky founded the Laura U Collection and the Laura U Design Studio in 2006. The two companies are combined under Laura U Inc. and headquartered in Houston. Previously, Umansky was an interior designer for Ladco Inc. Her studio works exclusively with residential interiors all over the United States, but mainly Houston, Los Angeles, Aspen, and Miami.

Umansky is an associate member of the American Institute of Architects and an allied member of the American Society of Interior Design. She works with residential properties, and designs spaces for corporate offices and hospitality interiors. Umansky hosts community and charitable events such as the Houston Fall Charity Affair, the Fall Art Fare, and the DiverseWorks "Luck of the Draw" event in which Umansky and her husband participated on the host committee.

Her work has been featured in Rue Magazine, the Houston Chronicle, Southern Lady Magazine, House Beautiful, Elle Decor India, and Luxe Interiors + Design.

References

American interior designers
Living people
Year of birth missing (living people)
University of Texas at Austin College of Fine Arts alumni
University of Houston alumni
American women interior designers
21st-century American women